The Border Cheviot, also known as the South Country Cheviot, is a breed of domesticated sheep from the UK.  It is native to the Cheviot Hills between Scotland and England. Recognized as early as 1372, the breed is reported to have developed from sheep that swam ashore from shipwrecked Spanish ships that fled northward after the defeat of the Armada.  This breed is prized for its wool but bred primarily for meat.

Characteristics
The Cheviot is a distinctive white-faced sheep, with a wool-free face and legs, pricked ears, black muzzle and black feet. It is a very alert and active sheep. Cheviot wool has a distinctive helical crimp, which gives it that highly desirable resilience. The fleece should be dense and firm with no kemp or coloured hair. The rams can have horns.

The live weight of a mature Border Cheviot ram is in the range of 70–85 kg and a mature ewe 55–70kg. Ewes have a lambing percentage of about 150%

References

External links
 cheviotsheep.org (U.K.)
 American Cheviot Sheep Society 

Sheep breeds originating in England
Sheep breeds originating in Scotland
Sheep breeds